Daniel Patrick Gruen (born June 26, 1952) is a retired professional ice hockey player who played 49 games in the National Hockey League and 181 games in the World Hockey Association.  He played with the Colorado Rockies, Detroit Red Wings, Michigan Stags, Winnipeg Jets, Cleveland Crusaders, Calgary Cowboys, and Minnesota Fighting Saints.

Career statistics

Regular season and playoffs

External links
 

1952 births
Living people
Baltimore Blades players
Calgary Cowboys players
Canadian ice hockey left wingers
Cleveland Crusaders players
Colorado Rockies (NHL) players
Dayton Gems players
Detroit Red Wings draft picks
Detroit Red Wings players
Fort Worth Wings players
Hampton Aces players
Ice hockey people from Ontario
Sportspeople from Thunder Bay
Kansas City Red Wings players
Michigan Stags players
Minnesota Fighting Saints players
Muskegon Mohawks players
Virginia Wings players
Winnipeg Jets (WHA) players